Höhenkirchen-Siegertsbrunn is a municipality in Upper Bavaria, situated south of Munich. It is one of the municipalities with the longest names in Germany, the longest being Hellschen-Heringsand-Unterschaar.

International relations

Twin towns — Sister cities
Höhenkirchen-Siegertsbrunn is twinned with:

  Montemarciano, Italy

References

Munich (district)